Jesús Candelas Rodrigo (born 7 October 1957) is a Spanish professional futsal coach.

Career

Spain
Candelas has managed four teams in Spain, which he first managed Algon for three years which his performance was bad. In 1996 when he managed Caja Segovia he led 2 championship titles and runners-up for Genk Tournament, after when he left Caja, he was appointed as Boomerang manager which he was successful leading them in a total of 3 championships and LFNS division runner-up and super cup winner in 2001.

Iran
During his term as the head coach of Iran he performed descent, before becoming coach in March 2013 Candelas was appointed as technical director of Iran futsal team in September 2012. He was appointed as team's head coach after Ali Sanei's contract with team meli was terminated due to poor and disappointing results at the 2012 FIFA Futsal World Cup held in Thailand, and a drop in the world ranking from 4th place to 7th. Candelas had his debut right after the lost against Colombia at the World Cup, Iran had two friendly matches at Qom where they tied both games against Russia. Candelas was supposed to be an interim coach but when he impressed Iranians by managing 15 undefeated streak matches, Abbas Torabian and Kafashian decided to let him stay for longer. In July 2013 he extended his contract with Iran for another year. One big achievement he did for Iran was being undefeated for many matches in a row, making Iran champions at 2013 Asian Indoor-Martial Arts Games, two bronze at Grand Prix de Futsal.

2014 AFC Futsal Championship
Iran automatically qualified at the championship since they were semi-finalists in the last edition in 2012. Jesús team faced Indonesia in the first match and they won 5–1, They also defeated China with a score of 12-0, and Australia 8–1. Iran advanced to next round with 9 points, they defeated Vietnam in Quarter-Finals. In the Semi-Final, Iran played Uzbekistan with the score of 10–0. They eventually lost to Japan on penalties, after leading Japan 2-1 later Hamid Ahmadi scored an own goal which equalized the match. Iran finished as runner-up, having scored the more comparing to their previous edition. Iran scored 52 goals and conceded 8 goals in the whole tournament.

Honours

 Spain
Primera División: 5
2001–02, 2002–03, 2003–04, 2004–05, 2007–08
Copa de España (LNFS): 4
2000–01, 2003–04, 2004–05, 2006–07
Supercopa de España: 5
2001–02, 2002–03, 2003–04, 2005–06, 2007–08	
UEFA Futsal Cup: 2
2003-04, 2005–06
Intercontinental Cup: 4
2004-05, 2005–06, 2006–07, 2007–08
European Cup Winners' Cup: 1
2007-08 	
Iberian Cup: 2
2004, 2006
 Iran
AFC Futsal Championship: 0
2014 Runner-Up
Grand Prix de Futsal: 0
2013 Third-Place, 2014 Third-Place
Asian Indoor and Martial Arts Games: 1 
2013

Managerial statistics

Notes and references

External links
 Blog personal de Jesus Candelas
 Jesus Candelas en Futsalplanet

1957 births
Living people
Spanish men's futsal players
Sportspeople from Madrid
Iran national futsal team managers
Spanish futsal coaches